The United States Croquet Hall of Fame was established in 1979 by the Croquet Foundation of America to recognize individuals with exceptional skill in the sport of croquet or men and women who have contributed to the sport's health and growth.  The Croquet Hall of Fame is located in West Palm Beach, Florida, at the headquarters of the United States Croquet Association, the National Croquet Center.  Each year, new inductees to the Croquet Foundation of America's Hall of Fame are celebrated at a fund-raising dinner and ball usually held at the National Croquet Center.

Inductees to the Croquet Hall of Fame, by year:

 1979
Margaret Emerson
Samuel Goldwyn
Averell Harriman
Moss Hart
Milton "Doc" Holden
George S. Kaufman
Harpo Marx
Dorothy Rodgers
Herbert Bayard Swope Sr.
Joseph Tankoos
Alexander Woollcott
Daryl Zanuck

 1980
John David Griffin
Howard Hawks
John Lavalle
Suzie Linden
Duncan McMartin
Lillian Phipps
Richard Rodgers
Michael Romanoff
George Sanders
Gig Young

 1981
George Abbott
Andrew Fuller
Louis Jourdan
Frederick Shock, Jr.
Herbert Bayard Swope, Jr.

 1982
Raoul Fleischmann
Jean Negulesco
Edmund A. Prentis III
Francis Tayloe

 1983
 Paul Butler
 William Harbach
 Jack R. Osborn
 Nelga Young
 John Young II

 1984
William Hawks
Richard Pearman
Archie Peck
Catherine Tankoos-Barrett

 1985
Hilda McMartin
Elizabeth Newell

 1986
Tom McDonnell

 1987
Barton Gubelmann
Walter Gubelmann

 1988
Cesare Danova
Ned Skinner
Frederick Supper

 1989
E.A. "Teddy" Prentis IV
S. Cortland Wood

 1990
Al Heath
Jim Lyons

 1991
Jean Arrington
Patricia Supper

 1992
Robert Clayton
Don Degnan
Lee A. Olsen

 1993
Peyton Ballenger
Mack Penwell

 1994
Rudulph E. (Foxy) Carter

 1995
Archie Burchfield
W. Ellery McClatchy
Stan Patmor
Forrest Tucker

 1996
John Donnell
Bill Hoy
Russ Ketcham

 1997
James B. Miles

 1998
James H.U. Hughes

 1999
Michael Gibbons
Robert Kroeger

 2000
Ray Bell
Reynold E. Kraft
Jerry Stark

 2001
Charles P. Steuber

 2002
Norma S. Truman

 2003
Freeman A. (Bill) Berne
Billie Jean Berne

 2004
William (Bill) W. Campbell

 2005
 Fred Jones
John C. Osborn

 2006
John W. Curington

 2007
 Robert (Bob) Chilton

  2008
 Diane Blow
 Jackie C. Jones

  2009
 Honoring all previous inductees

  2010
 Alexander Ix
 Dr. William Luke
 Margaret Mihlon
  2011
 Dan Mahoney
 Rich Curtis
 Richard Brackett
  2012
 Jack McMillin
 Johnny Mitchell
 Ruth Summers
  2013
 Charles Lazarus
 Anne Frost Robinson
 Rhys Thomas
  2014 
 W. David McCoy
 Ervand Peterson
  2015 
 Shereen Hayes
 Steve C Johnston
 Mike Orgill
  2016
 Damon Bidencope
 Albert J (Bert) Myer 
  2017
 Digby Bridges 
  2018
 Ben Rothman
 Eugene F. “Gene” Young 
 2019
 Harvey Geiger
 Danny Huneycutt
 John W. Solomon (posthumously)
  2020
 Sherif Abdelwahab
 Rory J. Kelley
  2021
 Jim Bast
 Mohammad Kamal
  2022
 David Ekstrom
 Jacques Fournier

  2023
 Harold (Hal) Denton
 Robert L (Bob) Alman (posthumously)

See also

 United States Croquet Association

Sources 
 Croquet National Center

References

Croquet in the United States
Halls of fame in Florida
Buildings and structures in West Palm Beach, Florida
Sports museums in Florida
Sports halls of fame